Antelope is a small unincorporated community near the intersection of Loop 187, U.S. Highway 281, and Farm to Market Road 175, twenty miles northwest of Jacksboro in northwestern Jack County, Texas. The population is 65.

History
Antelope is one of the oldest active communities in Jack County.  After receiving a post office in 1858, the town became a ranching center because of its fertile soil and proximity to the West Fork of the Trinity River.  It served as a frontier town for Anglo settlers in Jack and southern Clay counties.  Its initial success led to a town survey in 1875, after which a town square, hotel, general store, churches, and a school were developed to service the farmers and ranchers of the area.  When US Route 281 was developed through Jack County, it bypassed Antelope by less than a mile, but a "spur" or "loop" was built (Loop 187) to connect the small community to the major highway.  Antelope never particularly flourished in the 20th century, despite oil discoveries in the area, and the population never exceeded 300, its population at the 1900 census.  By the 1940s, the population had dropped in half, and by 2000, the population stood at 65.

Climate
The climate in this area is characterized by hot, humid summers and generally mild to cool winters.  According to the Köppen Climate Classification system, Antelope has a humid subtropical climate, abbreviated "Cfa" on climate maps.

References

Unincorporated communities in Texas
Unincorporated communities in Jack County, Texas